John Malet (c. 1573 – 10 April 1644) was an English politician who sat in the House of Commons.

Malet was the son of Sir John Malet of Enmore, Somerset. He matriculated at the Balliol College, Oxford on 17 May 1588, aged 14 and was awarded BA on 28 January 1591. He succeeded his father in 1615.

In 1624, he was elected member of parliament for Bath in the Happy Parliament. He was appointed High Sheriff of Somerset for 1636.

In 1638 he obtained a Commission under the Great Seal from King Charles II to improve the navigation on the River Tone. This granted him and his heirs sole navigation rights from Bridgwater to Ham Mills, and allowed him to improve the river at his own expense. He saw this as a philanthropic action, as it reduced the price of coal to the poor people of Taunton, as well as improving the transport infrastructure.

He died in 1644 and was buried in Bath Abbey. He had married Ann, the daughter of Sir John Tracy of Toddington, Gloucestershire, with whom he had one son and four daughters. He was succeeded by his son, John.

References

 

1570s births
1644 deaths
Alumni of Balliol College, Oxford
English MPs 1624–1625
High Sheriffs of Somerset